Patok is a municipality in the former Fushë-Kuqe Commune, Lezhë County, northwestern Albania. At the 2015 local government reform, it became part of the municipality Kurbin.

References

External links

Populated places in Kurbin
Villages in Lezhë County